Spring Hill Music Group is a contemporary Christian music record label based in the United States. As of July 2007, the Spring Hill Music Group is home to nineteen different Christian artists and produces the Shout! series and Songtime Kids record series.

History 
Spring Hill was founded in 1994 as Chapel Music Group by Bill Gaither and Leland Boren.

Labels 
As of July 2007, Spring Hill Music Group is also the parent label of two smaller Christian labels: Slanted Records, a self-described progressive pop and modern rock Christian label and Spring Hill Worship, a label dedicated to releasing Christian worship music albums; Green Hill Music, which markets easy-listening, jazz, inspirational and pop general-market releases to specialty retailers, and Hillsboro to target instrumental jazz.

Notable Christian artists currently signed by Spring Hill Music Group, as of July 2007, include: DecembeRadio (Slanted Records), Al Denson, Eden's Bridge, Buddy Greene, Inhabited (Slanted Records), Janet Paschal, Scott Krippayne, Oak Ridge Boys, Dottie Rambo, and Wayne Watson.

See also 
 List of contemporary Christian music record labels
 List of record labels

External links
Official site
Green Hill Music website

References

American record labels
Christian record labels
Rock record labels